Ignjatović is a Serbian surname, a patronymic derived from the masculine given name Ignjat. It may refer to:

 Aleksandar Ignjatović, Serbian footballer
 Jakov Ignjatović, Serbian writer
 Nevena Ignjatović, Serbian alpine skier
Vera Ignjatovic, Serbian-born Australian haematologist and former handball player

Serbian surnames
Patronymic surnames
Surnames from given names